Broughton High School is a secondary school located in the north of Edinburgh, Scotland. In 2009, the building at Inverleith was replaced with a building funded by a public–private partnership. The school is currently situated next to Inverleith Park, in the Stockbridge neighbourhood of Edinburgh but was formerly in Broughton, where the poet Hugh MacDiarmid was a pupil.

Description
The school was recently named in Tatlers list of top state schools.

The school is home to a specialised music department: the City of Edinburgh Music School which nearly faced closure in 2018. Along with the music school Broughton has a specialist dance department. Broughton is also one of seven schools in Scotland chosen by the Scottish Football Association to support talented young footballers with extra coaching. As of 2018, the dedicated coach for the young players at Broughton is former Hibernian player Keith Wright.

The school's motto Fortiter et Recte is Latin for 'to have the strength to do the right thing'.

The Senior Leadership Team consists of the Headteacher (John J. Wilson) and three Deputy Headteachers (L.Evans, S.Bennett and S.Wallace). The school also has a Director of Music (T.Morris) and a Business Manager (A.Sansom-Parnell).

HMI(E) report
In the last report, issued in September 2011, Her Majesty's Inspectorate of Education concluded that areas of strength were the school's leadership, care and welfare and specialist provisions. It stated that development was required on areas such as overall achievement, expectations and consistency.

In February 2014, the school received a follow-up report which concluded that improvements had been made. The report stated that S4-S6 attainment in 2013 was the highest in the last three years.

Notable alumni

 Martyn Bennett, bagpiper
 Alan Bold, Critic and Poet 
 Mary Fee, Scottish Labour Party politician
 Shirley Manson, lead singer of Garbage
 Sean McKirdy, footballer
 David Murray, Entrepreneur, Scottish Businessman
 Angus Robertson SNP politician
 Tommy Smith, saxophonist, composer

References

External links
 Broughton High School website
 Broughton High School's page on Scottish Schools Online
 City of Edinburgh Music School Website
 Photo of New School Building

Secondary schools in Edinburgh
Educational institutions established in 1887
1887 establishments in Scotland
Youth football in Scotland